Casablanca is the fifth album by Australian punk band The Saints. The full title on the album's cover is I Thought This Was Love, but This Ain't Casablanca, however the official title of the album is simply Casablanca. It was released internationally as Out in the Jungle ... Where Things Ain't So Pleasant.

The Saints' founder and vocalist Chris Bailey said, "This is my own opinion, and it changes with a few drinks or whatever, but it's the first record I can actually say I like the atmosphere of, the closest I've ever got to making a record that... seems closer to what I had up here."

Track listing
All tracks composed by Chris Bailey; except where indicated
"Follow the Leader" – 3:44
"Rescue" – 2:38
"Senile Dementia" – 5:14
"Casablanca" – 3:52
"Curtains" – 3:42
"Come On" – 2:55
"1000 Faces" – 3:05
"Animal" – 2:25
"Out in the Jungle" º 2:55
"Beginning of the Tomato Party" (Janine Hall, Iain Shedden, Chris Bailey) – 5:16
"Out of Sight" – 3:12

Personnel
 Chris Bailey – vocals
 Janine Hall – bass
 Iain Shedden – drums
 Roger Cawkwell – saxophone, bass clarinet, organ
 Paul Neiman – trombone
 Steve Sidwell – trumpet
 Hugh McDowell – cello
 Denis Haines – piano on "Rescue"
 Jess Sutcliffe – piano on "Out in the Jungle"
 Brian James  –  lead guitar (on tracks 2, 8, 10, 11)

Production
 Chris Bailey – producer
 Jess Sutcliffe – engineer

References

The Saints (Australian band) albums
1982 albums
Mushroom Records albums